"Choucoune", was the nickname of a Haitian woman in a lyrical passage that praises her beauty. It may refer to:

"Choucoune" (poem), an 1883 Haitian Creole poem by Haitian Oswald Durand
"Choucoune" (song), an 1893 Haitian Creole song composed by Michel Mauléart Monton with lyrics from the poem by Durand, completely rewritten in English as the 1957 song "Yellow Bird"